Jakovina is a Croatian and West Ukrainian surname. Notable people with the surname include:

 Sandra Petrović Jakovina (born 1985), Croatian politician
 Tina Jakovina (born 1992), Slovenian basketball player
 Tvrtko Jakovina (born 1972), Croatian historian

See also
 

Croatian surnames
Ukrainian-language surnames